Jalopies & Expensive Guitars is an extended play (EP) by American country singer–songwriter Ashley McBryde. It was released on March 11, 2016 via Road Life Records and contained eight tracks. It was the first extended play released in McBryde's career and would help her secure a recording contract with Warner Music Nashville shortly after.

Background, content and release
In 2006 and 2011 respectively, Ashley McBryde released two demo albums that brought interest to her music career. This would lead to the making of Jalopies & Expensive Guitars. McBryde collaborated with Bart Butler on the project. A total of eight tracks were included on extended play including the song "Bible and a .44". The song would later be recorded by Trisha Yearwood for her 2019 album Every Girl. Six other tracks of music were also included, along with an introduction to the EP.

Jalopies & Expensive Guitars was released on March 11, 2016 on Road Life Records. It was offered to digital and streaming sites upon its North American release. The EP would eventually help McBryde gain exposure from successful country artists, like Eric Church, who brought onstage to sing a track from the album. The New York Times later reflected on the EP's release, calling it a collection of songs that McBryde that "for the most part, ones she’d written for other people, not herself." The publication also noted that McBryde was told to straighten her hair for the EP's cover. She later signed with Warner Music Nashville following the attention McBryde received from her music.

Track listing

Release history

References

2016 EPs
Ashley McBryde EPs